John P. Jacob (born 1957) is an American curator. He grew up in Italy and Venezuela, graduated from the Collegiate School (1975) in New York City, and studied at the University of Chicago before earning a BA in human ecology from the College of the Atlantic (1981) and an MA in art history from Indiana University (1994).

Mailart and photography 

John Jacob began his career as an artist, working with reproductive media including photography, Xerography, rubber-stamps, mail-art, and artist's books. During the 1980s, he taught classes on color Xerox and the rubber stamp as a print-making medium, at Pratt Manhattan, with mail-artist Ed Plunkett, and founded the Riding Beggar Press ("If wishes were horses...") to promote his and other artists' work. His first sale, of a sheet of artists' stamps for $75, was from an exhibition curated by Buster Cleveland for the 13th Hour Gallery (NY, 1984).

Jacob's efforts during this period include the irregular mail-art magazine PostHype (1981–85), and the International Portfolio of Artists' Photography (1983–86), an assembling book project conceived to integrate mail-art, book-art, and photography. Increasingly interested in issues related to censorship, and working with artists in the Soviet Bloc countries of Eastern Europe, the final issue of PostHype (4.1) documented a mail- and phone-art project entitled East/West: Mail Art & Censorship. In 1987, in a self-proclaimed withdrawal from mail-art, Jacob published The Coffee Table Book of Mail Art: The Intimate Letters of J.P. Jacob. With an advertisement declaring "Each copy contains a valuable original artwork by a famous mailartist!!" Jacob gave away original works to recipients of the publication until his collection was exhausted. Jacob continued to exhibit as a photographer through the 1980s, presenting his last one-person exhibition, entitled I'm Trying  to See, at the Liget Galeria, Budapest, in 1988. He occasionally exhibited under the pseudonym Janos Jaczkó after that.

Eastern Europe and USSR 

Since the mid-1980s, Jacob has worked with artists in Eastern Europe and the former USSR, guest-curating exhibitions for institutions in the United States and Europe, including the Liget Gallery, Budapest, Hungary, the List Visual Arts Center at MIT, the Allen Memorial Art Museum at Oberlin College, and the Staatliche Galerie Moritzburg, Halle (Saale), Germany. From 1986 to 1989, he was supported by grants from the Soros Foundations, Hungary and USSR. Émigré writer Jerzy Kosinski contributed an introductory statement to the exhibition Out of Eastern Europe: Private Photography (1987), describing the work presented as “the penultimate art of spiritual confrontation.” Jacob's exhibition The Missing Picture: Alternative Contemporary Photography in the Soviet Union (1990) was the first one-person exhibition of Ukrainian photographer Boris Mikhailov in the US, accompanied by a parallel exhibition of works by four young Soviet photographers inspired by him.

Recollecting a Culture: Photography and the Evolution of a Socialist Aesthetic in East Germany (1999), commemorating the 10th anniversary of the fall of the Berlin Wall, presented the archive of the FotoKino Verlag, publisher of the GDR's professional photography periodical, Fotografie, with works dating from 1929 to 1989. The American photographer and theorist Diane Neumaier, in her history of Soviet non-conformist photography, credited Jacob's work as foundational to that of later historians such as herself. His essay "After Roskolnikov: Russian Photography Today," edited by Neumaier for the College Art Association's Art Journal, critically examined the impact of Western attention, including his own, on the art of post-Perestroika Russia.

Career and research 

Jacob has been an arts administrator since the 1990s. He became director of exhibitions for the Photographic Resource Center at Boston University in 1992, and was named executive director in 1993. Jacob's exhibitions for the PRC include There is No Eye, a retrospective of photographer/musician John Cohen (2002), and Facing Death: Portraits from Cambodia’s Killing Fields (with Robert E. Seydel , 1997). Other exhibitions Jacob curated for the PRC explored the intersections of photography with dance and music, including the first presentation of photographs by
Lou Reed.

In 2003, Jacob was named founding director of the Inge Morath Foundation by Morath's husband, playwright Arthur Miller, and daughter, film-maker Rebecca Miller, and in 2014 facilitated the acquisition of the Morath archive by the Beinecke Library at Yale University and a collection of her master prints by the Yale University Art Gallery. From 2011 to 2015, he served as Program Director for the Magnum Foundation's Legacy Program, and as contributing editor for Esopus (magazine) re-created early Magnum distributions, in a series entitled "Analog Recovery," from the vast Magnum archive. He is presently McEvoy Family Curator for Photography at the Smithsonian American Art Museum. Among Jacob's exhibitions for SAAM, the Art Newspaper ranked Diane Arbus: A box of ten photographs the first most visited photography exhibition and the ninth most visited art exhibition worldwide for 2019, with 1,677,000 attendees; and it ranked Trevor Paglen: Sites Unseen the thirteenth most visited art exhibition, with 1,132,800 attendees.

Jacob is married to Noriko Fuku, professor and director of the Art Communication Research Center at the Kyoto University of Art and Design (semi-retired 2017). Jacob's curatorial projects with Fuku include Patti Smith & Friends: Drawings by Patti Smith, Polaroids by Oliver Ray, and Photographs by Michael Stipe (2002), for the Museum Eki, Kyoto, and Man Ray: Unconcerned But Not Indifferent (2007), for the PhotoEspaña photography festival, Madrid. The exhibition traveled throughout Europe and to the National Museums of Japan in Tokyo and Osaka.

Jacob's papers and the archive of the Riding Beggar Press are held by the Beinecke Library at Yale University.

Selected exhibitions 
Welcome Home: A Portrait of East Baltimore, 1975–1980, Smithsonian American Art Museum, Washington, DC, 2021.
New on View: Dawoud Bey and William H. Johnson. Smithsonian American Art Museum, Washington, DC, 2020.
Trevor Paglen: Sites Unseen. Smithsonian American Art Museum, Washington, DC, 2018.
Diane Arbus: A box of ten photographs. Smithsonian American Art Museum, Washington, DC, 2018.
Harlem Heroes: Photographs by Carl Van Vechten. Smithsonian American Art Museum, Washington, DC, 2016.
No Mountains in the Way: Photographs from the Kansas Documentary Survey, 1974. Coordinator for Smithsonian American Art Museum, Washington, DC, 2016.
Willie Alexander: Wallworks. Co-curator with Noriko Fuku. Esopus Space, New York, NY, 2012.
Erich Hartmann: New York Stories, 1946–57. Co-curator with Anna Patricia Kahn. Amerika Haus, Munich, Germany, 2012.
Inge Morath: First Color. Magnum Photos Gallery, Paris, France, 2009.
Well Disposed and Trying to See: Inge Morath & Arthur Miller in China. University of Michigan Art Museum, Ann Arbor, 2008.
Man Ray: Unconcerned But Not Indifferent. Co-curator with Noriko Fuku. European Tour: PHotoESPAÑA / Museo ICO, Madrid, Spain, traveled 2007–2009. Japanese Tour: New National Art Centre, Tokyo, traveled 2010–2012.
Eye in the World / The World in Me: Photographs by Peter Granser, Laura McPhee, Selina Ou, and Kiriko Shirobayashi. Pingyao International Photography Festival, Pingyao, China, 2006.
Chinese Encounters: Words and Photographs by Inge Morath & Arthur Miller. Pingyao International Photography Festival, Pingyao, China, 2005.
The Road to Reno: Photographs by Inge Morath. Chicago Cultural Center, IL, 2005 Traveled 2005–09.
There is No Eye: Photographs by John Cohen. Photographic Resource Center, Boston, 2002.
Recollecting a Culture: Photography and the Evolution of East German Socialism. Selections from the FotoKino Archives, 1947–1990. Photographic Resource Center, Boston, 1999.
Patti Smith & Friends, Drawings by Patti Smith, Polaroids by Oliver Ray, and Photographs by Michael Stipe. Co-curator with Noriko Fuku. Museum Eki, Kyoto, Japan, 1999.
Facing Death: Portraits from Cambodia’s Killing Fields. Co-curator with Robert E. Seydel. Photographic Resource Center, Boston, 1997.
Chimæra: Aktuelle Photokunst aus Mitteleuropa. Co- curator with T.O. Immisch. Staatliche Galerie Moritzburg, Halle, Germany, 1997.
Extended Play: Photographs, Video, Fashion Design, and Works on Paper by Musicians (Willie Alexander, Laurie Anderson, Peter Blegvad, John Cohen, Kevin Coyne, Chris Cutler, Kim Gordon, Mike Gordon, Tony Levin, Eric Meza, Lou Reed, Vernon Reid, Patti Smith, and Sandra Stark). Photographic Resource Center, Boston, 1997.
Matthias Leupold: Fahnenappell & Gartenlaube. Photographic Resource Center, Boston, 1995.
Photographs by Dennis Hopper: 1961–1967. Co-curator with Robert E. Seydel. Photographic Resource Center, Boston, 1994.
Return and Exile: Sylvia Plachy's Photographs from Central Europe and Susan Rubin Suleiman's Budapest Diary. Photographic Resource Center, Boston, 1984.
Other Africas: Photographs by Max Belcher, Fazal Sheikh, and Vera Viditz-Ward. Photographic Resource Center, Boston, 1983.
Virginia Beahan & Laura McPhee: No Ordinary Land. Photographic Resource Center, Boston, 1982.
The Missing Picture: Boris Michailov. List Visual Arts Center at MIT, Cambridge, MA, 1990.
The Missing Picture: Alternative Contemporary Photography in the Soviet Union (Vladimir Kupreanov, Ilya Piganov, Maria Serebrjakova, Alexey Shulgin). List Visual Arts Center at MIT, Cambridge, MA, 1990.
Hidden Story: Samizdat from Hungary and Elsewhere. Co-curator with Tibor Várnagy. Franklin Furnace Archive, New York, 1990.
The Metamorphic Medium: Contemporary Photography from Hungary. Allen Memorial Art Museum, Oberlin, OH, 1989.
Leupold/Leupold. Portland School of Art, Portland, ME, 1988.
The Photo Diary of Anna Bohdziewicz (selections from 1986–89). Photographic Resource Center, Boston, 1987.
Out of Eastern Europe: Private Photography. List Visual Arts Center at MIT, Cambridge, MA, 1987.
Second International Portfolio of Artists' Photography. Liget Galeria & Galeria 11, Budapest, Hungary, 1986.
First International Portfolio of Artists' Photography. Büro fur Kunstlerische, Trogen, Switzerland, 1983.

Selected publications 
 "Depicting Love in Diane Arbus’s 'A woman with her baby monkey, 1971'." SAAM Eye Level (April 7, 2022)
 "The Year of Photography: A Remembrance of Joan Clark Netherwood." SAAM Eye Level (March 29, 2021)
 “Time Travel with Tibor Várnagy” in Várnagy Tibor: Photos without Camera, 1985–1993, ACB Research Lab, Budapest, Hungary, 2019. 
 Trevor Paglen: Sites Unseen. Washington, DC: Smithsonian American Art Museum, 2018. 
 Diane Arbus: A box of ten photographs. Washington, DC: Smithsonian American Art Museum, and Aperture Foundation, NY, 2018. 
 Harlem Heroes: Photographs by Carl Van Vechten. Washington, DC: Smithsonian American Art Museum, 2016. 
 Inge Morath: On Style. New York: Abrams, 2016. 
 Ernst Haas: On Set. Göttingen: Steidl Verlag, 2015. 
 "Analog Recovery 4: Starry Night: Photographs by Dennis Stock." Esopus 20 (Spring 2014)
 "Analog Recovery 3: Rosita's Pigeons: Photographs by Burt Glinn." Esopus 19 (Spring 2013)
 "Analog Recovery 2: Home Studio: Photographs by Erich Hartmann." Esopus 18 (Spring 2012)
 Kodak Girl: The Martha Cooper Collection. Göttingen: Steidl Verlag, 2011. 
 “Inge Morath: the Mask Series with Saul Steinberg.” Foam 26 (Spring 2011), Amsterdam
 "Analog Recovery 1: Bal d’Hiver: Photographs by Inge Morath." Esopus 17 (Fall 2011)
 Man Ray: Unconcerned But Not Indifferent (Japanese edition, with Noriko Fuku). Tokyo: National Art Center/Nikkei, Inc., 2010.
 Man Ray: Trees + Flowers, Insects Animals. Göttingen: Steidl Verlag, 2009. 
 Inge Morath: First Color. Göttingen: Steidl Verlag, 2009. 
 Inge Morath: Iran. Göttingen: Steidl Verlag, 2009. 
 Man Ray: Unconcerned But Not Indifferent (first European edition, with Noriko Fuku). Madrid: La Fabrica, 2007. 
 Inge Morath: The Road to Reno. Göttingen: Steidl Verlag, 2006. 
 “The Artistic Vision of Edwin Land,” in American Perspectives: Photographs from the Polaroid Collection, Michiko Kasahara, ed. Tokyo: Tokyo Metropolitan Museum of Photography, 2000. 
 “End Paper: Redefining the People's Culture in East Germany.” Chronicle of Higher Education, January 14, 2000
 Recollecting a Culture: Photography and the Evolution of a Socialist Aesthetic in East Germany. Boston: Photographic Resource Center at Boston University, 1998
 “Seeing Sound/Hearing Sight: Christian Marclay.” Rundbrief Fotografie, Wolfgang Jaworek ed., 1998 5(3), Stuttgart, Germany
 Patti Smith and Friends: Drawings by Patti Smith, Polaroid by Oliver Ray, and Photography by Michael Stipe (with Noriko Fuku). Kyoto: Museum EKI, 1998
 Chimaera: Aktuelle Photokunst aus Mitteleruopa (with T.O. Immisch). Halle: Staatliche Galerie Moritzburg, 1997. 
 “Introduction,” in Matthias Leupold: Living Pictures 1983–95. Schöppingen: Künstlerdorf Schöppingen, 1996
 "After Roskolnikov: Russian Photography Today." Art Journal, Summer 1994 53(2), 22-27
 “Aesthetic Revolution or Personal Evolution?” in Eternal Network: A Mailart Anthology, Chuck Welch ed. Calgary: University of Calgary Press, 1994
 “Photoglyphs,” in Photoglyphs: Rimma & Valeriy Gerlovin, Mark Sloan ed. New Orleans Museum of Art, LA, 1993. 
 The Missing Picture: Alternative Contemporary Photography from the Soviet Union. Cambridge: List Visual Arts Center at MIT, 1991
 "Perspectives, Real & Imaginary: Czechoslovakian Photography at FotoFest." Spot, Houston Center for Photography, Winter 1991
 Hidden Story: Samizdat from Hungary and Elsewhere (with Tibor Varnagy). New York: Franklin Furnace, 1990
 "Recalling Hajas" in Nightmare Works: Tibor Hajas (with Steven S. High). Richmond: Anderson Art Gallery at Virginia Commonwealth University, 1990
 “Metamorphic Game: The Art of Rimma & Valeriy Gerlovin,” in Still Performances, Katy Kline ed. Cambridge: List Visual Arts Center at MIT, 1989
 The Metamorphic Medium: New Photography from Hungary. Oberlin: Allen Memorial Art Museum, 1989
 "The Legacy of Witkacy." Spot, Houston Center for Photography, Spring 1989, 4-7
 I am Trying to See. Budapest: Liget Gallery, 1988
 Thomas Florscheutz (with Steven S. High). Richmond: Anderson Art Gallery at Virginia Commonwealth University, 1988
 “The Politics of Experience: Identity and Identification in Documentary Photography.” Views NE Journal of Photography, Winter 1987. Boston: Photographic Resource Center at  Boston University
 Out of Eastern Europe: Private Photography. Cambridge: List Visual Arts Center at MIT, 1987
 The Second International Portfolio of Artists' Photography: Photography by Eastern European Artists (with Tibor Várnagy). Budapest: Liget Gallery and New York: Riding Beggar Press, 1986
 The First International Portfolio of Artists' Photography. New York: Riding Beggar Press, 1985

Awards 
 First Prize, Exhibition Catalogs for Diane Arbus: A box of ten photographs, Museum Publications Design Competition, American Alliance of Museums, 2019
 Finalist, Lucie Photo Book Prize for Diane Arbus: A box of ten photographs, Lucie Foundation, New York, NY, 2019
 Shpilman International Prize for Excellence in Photography, Israel Museum, Jerusalem, 2012
 Die schönsten Bucher Award, Siftung Buchkunst, Berlin, for Inge Morath: The Road to Reno, 2007

References

External links 
John P. Jacob / Riding Beggar Press Collection, Beinecke Rare Book and Manuscript Library, Yale University, New Haven, CT
"Smithsonian Acquires Rare Photographs From the First African American Studios", Aruna D'Souza, New York Times, 8/20/2021
At the Smithsonian, a photographic portrait of East Baltimore, decades before the dawn of the selfie era, Kelsey Ables, Washington Post, August 26, 2021
Video Introduction for "Welcome Home: A Portrait of East Baltimore, 1975–1980", Smithsonian American Art Museum, Washington, DC, 2021
The International Portfolio of Artists' Photography, Tibor Várnagy re-views the archival record of projects with Jacob in Eastern Europe
What Do Facial Recognition Technologies Mean for Our Privacy? Jordan G. Teicher, NY Times, July 18, 2018
Artist Lecture with Trevor Paglen, Smithsonian American Art Museum, June 20, 2018
"Trevor Paglen: Sites Unseen" Panel Discussion, John Jacob with Trevor Paglen, Kate Crawford, Wendy Hui Kyong Chun, and Alvaro Bedoya, Smithsonian American Art Museum, October 26, 2018
In a world full of surveillance, artist Trevor Paglen stares back, Jeffrey Brown, PBS Newshour, August 10, 2018
Exhibition page for "Trevor Paglen: Sites Unseen", Smithsonian American Art Museum, June 21, 2018 – January 6, 2019
Video Introduction for "Trevor Paglen: Sites Unseen", Smithsonian American Art Museum, June 28, 2018
The Transformative Nature of the Photographs of Diane Arbus, James Estrin, NY Times, June 21, 2018
"The Odyssey of Diane Arbus" Panel Discussion, John Jacob with Jeffrey Fraenkel, John Gossage, Karan Rinaldo, Jeff Rosenheim, Neil Selkirk, and Jasper Johns, Smithsonian American Art Museum, April 6, 2018
Exhibition page for "Diane Arbus: A box of ten photographs", Smithsonian American Art Museum, April 6, 2018 – January 27, 2019
Exhibition page for "Harlem Heroes: Photographs by Carl Van Vechten", Smithsonian American Art Museum, August 25, 2016 – April 1, 2017
Exhibition Page for "No Mountains in the Way: Photographs from the Kansas Documentary Survey, 1974", Smithsonian American Art Museum, February 26, 2016 – July 30, 2016
Clarice Smith Distinguished Lecture: Trevor Paglen, Smithsonian American Art Museum, September 9, 2015
What Inge Morath Saw: A Unique Sense of Style, Kerri MacDonald, NY Times, October 26, 2016
Interview with Gyetvai Ágnes and John Jacob, 1986 (in Hungarian)
I'm Trying to See at the Liget Galeria, Budapest, 1988
On meeting György Galántai, Budapest, 1986

Smithsonian Institution people
American curators
Photography curators
Historians of photography
1957 births
Living people